The Hong Kong and Kowloon Trades Union Council is the third largest trade union federation in Hong Kong, after the Federation of Trade Unions (FTU) and pro-Beijing Federation of Hong Kong and Kowloon Labour Unions (FLU). It is affiliated with the International Trade Union Confederation.

HKTUC has been pro-Kuomintang, one of the main political parties of the Republic of China, since its establishment in 1948 and has maintained a close relationship with the party. It was the biggest rival to the leftist trade unions FTU and was seen as a rightist union. The former leader of the union, Pang Chun-hoi was the Legislative Council member for the Labour constituency from 1985 to 1995, while another seat of the two was occupied by the FTU leader Tam Yiu-chung before the handover of Hong Kong in 1997.

References

Citations

Sources

External links 

 

National trade union centres of Hong Kong
International Trade Union Confederation
Hong Kong–Taiwan relations
Anti-communist organizations
Trade unions in Hong Kong
Three Principles of the People